Castello Piccolomini (Italian for Piccolomini castle)  is a  castle in Capestrano, Province of L'Aquila (Abruzzo).

History 
The castle was built replacing a Medieval fort, of which remains the central tower. Several families, like Acquaviva, Piccolomini, and Medici, modified the building up to the current structure, completed in 1485.

Now the castle is used as city hall and it was deeply restructured in 1924.

Architecture 
The castle is made of two L shaped structure, of which the larger one, facing south-west, contains the main entrance from the town central square. The internal courtyard, with a well in the middle, has the old medieval tower facing north-east.

References

External links

 

Piccolomini (Capestrano)
Capestrano